Sfera is the largest mall in Bielsko-Biała, Poland housing about 120 shops, music club, cinema (Helios) and supermarket. Area: 38000 square meters.
In 2009 Sfera was connected with Sfera 2 and the area was enlarged to over 130000 square meters.

Buildings and structures in Bielsko-Biała
Shopping malls in Poland
Shopping malls established in 2001
Tourist attractions in Silesian Voivodeship